The canton of Harnes is a canton situated in the department of the Pas-de-Calais and in the Hauts-de-France region of northern France.

Geography 
The canton is organised around Harnes in the arrondissement of Lens. The elevation varies from 20m (Estevelles) to 46m (Harnes) for an average elevation of 29m.

Composition
At the French canton reorganisation which came into effect in March 2015, the canton was expanded from 3 to 6 communes:
Billy-Montigny
Bois-Bernard
Fouquières-lès-Lens
Harnes
Noyelles-sous-Lens  
Rouvroy

Population

See also 
Cantons of Pas-de-Calais 
Communes of Pas-de-Calais 
Arrondissements of the Pas-de-Calais department

References

Harnes